The Honor of the Mounted is a 1914 American silent short drama film directed by Allan Dwan and featuring Murdock MacQuarrie, Pauline Bush, and Lon Chaney. The film is now considered lost.

Plot
Mac, Jacques Laquox and Jacques' sister Marie all grew up together in a small town in the Rockies. Mac and Marie love each other, but Mac wants to make something of his life so he travels to the big city and decides to join the Mounties. Forrest, a fellow Mountie, is sent to Mac's old hometown to investigate a smuggling ring. There he meets Marie and attacks her lustfully. Jacques kills Forrest, and Mac is later sent there by his commanding officer to investigate the murder.

When he returns to his home town, Mac is jeered by his old friends, and even by Marie, for wearing the despised "redcoat". A "Canuck" whom Jacques once thrashed in a fistfight tells Mac all about the murder, and Mac is forced to arrest his old friend Jacques.

When the townspeople attack in a mob, Jacques fights at Mac's side and protects him. Mac refuses to take Jacques back as his prisoner, but Jacques reminds him of his duty as a Mountie. They struggle as they argue, and fall together to their deaths on a treacherous mountain called the "Devil's Slide."

Cast
 Murdock MacQuarrie as Mac, the Mountie
 Pauline Bush as Marie Laquox
 Lon Chaney as Jacques Laquox
 James Neill as Post Commandant
 Gertrude Short as Unknown

Production notes
The film was shot on location in Mount Lowe, California over a two-day period in 1913. Director Allan Dwan also shot Bloodhounds of the North (which also starred Murdock MacQuarrie, Pauline Bush, and Lon Chaney) the same week. During filming, Lon Chaney and screenwriter Arthur Rosson got lost in a canyon and were not located by a rescue party until the end of the day. The cast and crew were also stranded in their cabins for five days due to heavy rains. Dwan had the cast rehearse for an upcoming film, Richelieu, in an effort to save time.

Reception
"Universal Weekly" opined "Lon Chaney and Mr. MacQuarrie hold the center stage, acting out the great drama that strives to loosen their friendship."

"The Moving Picture World" wrote "This two-reel drama of the Canadian Northwest Mounted Police has been well acted and admirably staged. The atmosphere of the Northwest woods is always interesting...The story is good."

References

External links

1914 films
1914 drama films
1914 short films
Silent American drama films
American silent short films
American black-and-white films
Films directed by Allan Dwan
Films set in Canada
Films shot in California
Lost American films
Royal Canadian Mounted Police in fiction
Universal Pictures short films
1914 lost films
Lost drama films
1910s American films
1910s English-language films